Krister is a Swedish variant of the Swedish masculine given name Christer and may refer to:

Krister Bringéus (born 1954), Swedish diplomat
Krister Classon (born 1955), Swedish comedian, actor, director and screenwriter
Krister Dreyer (born 1974), Norwegian musician
Krister Hammarbergh (born 1963), Swedish politician of the Moderate Party
Krister Henriksson (born 1946), Swedish actor
Krister Kristensson (born 1942), Swedish football player
Krister Linder (born 1970), Swedish electronic musician
Krister Nordin (born 1968), Swedish football player
Krister Örnfjäder (born 1952), Swedish social democratic politician
Krister Sørgård (born 1970), Norwegian cross country skier
Krister Stendahl (1921–2008), Swedish theologian
Krister Wemberg (born 1992), Norwegian football player
Krister Wickman (1924–1993), Swedish politician

References 

Swedish masculine given names

no:Christer